The New Victoria Hospital is an ambulatory care hospital situated at Langside/Battlefield in the south-east of Glasgow. It is managed by NHS Greater Glasgow and Clyde.

History
The hospital, which was commissioned to replace the outpatient health care services previously provided by Glasgow Victoria Infirmary, was built on a site previously occupied by Queen's Park Public School. The construction work, which was carried out by Balfour Beatty at a cost of £100 million, began in December 2006 and was completed in early April 2009.

Services
The hospital was designed to treat around 400,000 annually. The facilities include 30 single-bed rooms with en-suite wet room and 30 rooms with four bays. There are eight operating theatres and 12 short-stay surgical beds. There is an MRI scanner and diagnostic services and specialist services such as cardiology, renal dialysis and gynaecology. The building was given an 'excellent' BREEAM rating. Features were incorporated to reduce the impact of traffic noise from the surrounding area.

References

External links

Hospital buildings completed in 2009
Hospitals in Glasgow
Teaching hospitals in Scotland
2009 establishments in Scotland
Hospitals established in 2009
NHS Scotland hospitals